Skoutari is a village and a community of the municipality of East Mani. Before the 2011 local government reform it was a part of the municipality of Gytheio, of which it was a municipal district. The 2011 census recorded 234 residents in the village and 293 residents in the community. The community of Skoutari covers an area of 11.667 km2. According to local tradition it was founded by refugees from the Fall of Constantinople in 1453.

History

Ancient Town
In the Mycenaean period of Greece, there was thought to be a town called Vorthona which is now submerged. In Ancient Greece, the town used to be called Asine. The town was under Spartan control. In 218 BC, the inhabitants of Asine defeated the army of Philip V of Macedon who was besieging the town. During the Roman period it belong to Sparta ever though most of the other towns in the area were part of the Union of Free Laconians.

Modern Town
The modern town of Skoutari was founded in 1453 AD by refugees from the namesake district of Constantinople who fled from the Ottomans during the Fall of Constantinople. While the rest of Greece fell to the Ottoman Turks, Mani remained free. In the 17th and 18th centuries, Skoutari became a haven for pirates which rivalled Oitylo. The Ottomans tried to conquer Mani in 1770 and they laid siege to the tower of the Grigorakis clan which was one of the most powerful in Mani and whose base was Skoutari and they blew it up with gunpowder after a three-day siege. The Ottoman army was later defeated in the Battle of Vromopigada in the plain outside Skoutari and repelled from Mani. The Ottomans tried to capture Skoutari again in 1815 but they were defeated and driven back. In 1832, Greece was recognized as an independent state and Skoutari became part of it. During World War II, Greece was invaded by the Germans and Italians who captured Skoutari.

Recent History
Now Skoutari is a peaceful sea town with around 150 residents during summer. Skoutari was struck by a forest fire in the last days of July 2007, it did not consume as much of the area as the 2006 dangerous fires, several firefighters, helicopters and planes battled the fire for days and left some groves and forests in damages.

Geography
Skoutari was built on a hill around 50 metres above the sea level. Skoutari is linked by a road linking Cape Tenaro and Gythio encircling the eastern half of the peninsula. Farmlands are in the valleys, the mountains dominate most of the area and forests covers the valley areas especially around the village, the rest of the land are made up of rocks, bushes and grasslands. The Skoutari Bay lies directly to the east and are surrounded by bluffs, rocks and treacherous landscapes.

Nearest places
Kotronas, south
Kalyvia, east

Administrative division
The community of Knidi consists of five separate settlements: 
Parasyros (population 59)
Skoutari (population 234)
The aforementioned population figures are as of 2011.

Historical population

See also
List of settlements in Laconia

References

Populated places in Laconia
Populated places in the Mani Peninsula
1453 establishments in Europe
Populated places established in the 1450s
East Mani